A View from 3rd Street is the second solo album from the singer/songwriter Jude Cole. Released in 1990, three years after his self-titled debut, this album contains Cole's biggest single, "Baby, It's Tonight", which went to #16 on the Billboard Hot 100 chart.  "Time for Letting Go" also cracked the U.S. top 40 peaking at #32 late in 1990.

Cole provides all of the vocal talent for this album as well as all lead guitar, both electric and acoustic. He performs the bass sections of "House Full of Reasons", "Baby, It's Tonight" and "Prove Me Wrong", and the piano on "Compared to Nothing".

Producer David Tyson won the "Producer of the Year" at the 1991 Juno Awards for his work on this album.

The Album peaked on the Billboard 200 Album Chart at 138 on June 2, 1990.

Country singer Billy Ray Cyrus released a cover version of "Time for Letting Go" in 1998; this version charted in Billboard's US Hot Country.

Track listing
All songs written by Jude Cole except as noted.
 "Hallowed Ground" (Cole, George M. Green) – 5:19
 "Baby, It's Tonight" – 3:40
 "House Full of Reasons" – 3:56
 "Get Me Through the Night" – 4:16
 "Time for Letting Go" – 4:18
 "Stranger to Myself" (Cole, David Tyson) – 3:58
 "This Time It's Us" – 4:35
 "Heart of Blues" – 4:59
 "Compared to Nothing" – 4:10
 "Prove Me Wrong" – 4:49

Personnel

Jude Cole - vocals, backing vocals, all electric, acoustic, slide and lead guitars, bass on tracks 2, 3, & 10
Tim Pierce - rhythm guitar on tracks 1, 2, 4, 5, & 7
David Tyson - keyboards, piano, organ, harmonium, drum programming
Lee Sklar - bass
Pat Mastelotto - drums, percussion
Jeff Porcaro - drums and percussion on track 9
Larry Williams - saxophone on track 8
E.G. Daily - backing vocals on tracks 4 & 8
Technical
Michael Ostin - executive producer
Greg Droman - recording engineer
Chris Lord-Alge - mixing
Stephen Marcussen - mastering

References

1990 albums
Jude Cole albums
Reprise Records albums